Spring Flowers, Spring Frost is a 2000 novel by Albanian author Ismail Kadare set in the 1990s when feuding and vendetta had returned to the country after the fall of the communist regime. The English translation by David Bellos was first published by The Harvill Press in 2002, and then by Vintage Books in 2003. It was translated not directly from Albanian, but from the French translation by Jusuf Vrioni (published by Fayard).

References

2000 Albanian novels
Novels by Ismail Kadare
Novels set in Albania
Novels set in the 1990s
Onufri Publishing House books